Sherman County Courthouse may refer to:

Sherman County Courthouse (Kansas), Goodland, Kansas, designed by Routledge & Hertz and built c.1930
Sherman County Courthouse (Nebraska), Loup City, Nebraska, listed on the National Register of Historic Places (NRHP)
Sherman County Courthouse (Oregon), Moro, Oregon, listed on the NRHP